Toyotarō is a masculine Japanese given name.

Possible writings
Toyotarō can be written using different combinations of kanji characters. Here are some examples:

The characters used for "taro" (太郎) literally means "thick (big) son" and usually used as a suffix to a masculine name, especially for the first son. The "toyo" part of the name can use a variety of characters, each of which will change the meaning of the name.

豊太郎, "bountiful, big son"
登代太郎, "climb up, generation, big son"
斗代太郎, "Big Dipper, generation, big son"

Other combinations...

豊太朗, "bountiful, thick, bright"
豊多朗, "bountiful, many, bright"
豊汰朗, "bountiful, excessive, bright"
登代太朗, "climb up, generation, thick, bright"
登代多朗, "climb up, generation, many, bright"

The name can also be written in hiragana とよたろう or katakana トヨタロウ.

Notable people with the name
, Japanese manga artist.
Toyotaro Isomura (磯村 豊太郎, 1868–1939), Japanese bureaucrat, businessman, and member of the House of Peers in the Meiji period.
Toyotaro Fukazawa (深沢 豊太郎, 1895–1944), Japanese politician.
Toyotaro Miyazaki (born 1944), Japanese martial artist.
, Japanese banker.

Japanese masculine given names